The 1961 Air Force Falcons football team represented the United States Air Force Academy as an independent during the 1961 NCAA University Division football season. Led by fourth-year head coach Ben Martin, the Falcons played their home games at DU Stadium in Denver, Colorado. They were outscored by their opponents 173–87 and finished with a record of 3–7.

Both Army and Navy were off of Air Force's  schedule this season and the next, when the new Falcon Stadium

Schedule

Personnel

References

Air Force
Air Force Falcons football seasons
Air Force Falcons football